A sweetener is a substance added to food or sweetened beverage to impart the flavor of sweetness.

Sweetener may also refer to:
 Sweetener (album), by Ariana Grande (2018)
 "Sweetener" (song), title track of the album

See also
 Global Sweeteners, a Hong Kong food company
 Sweetener World Tour, by Ariana Grande (2019)
 The Sweetener Sessions, a tour by Ariana Grande (2018)